Stephanie Johanns (formerly Armitage) is an American politician and businessperson. She is a former first lady of Nebraska and member of the Nebraska Legislature. Johanns was a county commissioner for Lancaster County.

Early life and education 
Johanns is from Arizona. She graduated from high school in Elkhart, Indiana and completed a degree in psychology at the University of Minnesota in 1977. She married Mike Armitage. They divorced in 1985 with no children. She married Mike Johanns on December 24, 1986. She is a Republican and a conservative Catholic.

Career 
In 1985, Johanns was a part-time manager of the Greater Lincoln Private Industry Council. She left the post on November 25, 1985 to work as the information center coordinator at Lincoln Telephone Company. In that role, she oversaw three employees supporting the internal computer users.  Johanns was a county commissioner for Lancaster County.

Nebraska governor Kay A. Orr appointed Johanns to the Nebraska Legislature to fill the Bill Harris' vacancy when he became the mayor of Lincoln. She served from 1987 to 1988 and did not run for reelection.

In 1998, the Girls Scouts presented Johanns the spirit of girl scout award.

Johanns, the wife of Mike Johanns, was the First Lady of Nebraska from 1999 to 2005. Johanns was the honorary chair of the Nebraska Volunteer Service Commission. She was awarded the 2001 leader in communication honor by the Lincoln chapter of the International Association of Business Communicators.

In 2004, she was the vice president of external affairs for Alltel in Lincoln. Johanns is a senior vice president at Verizon in Washington, D.C.

References 

Women state legislators in Nebraska
20th-century American women politicians
21st-century American women politicians
21st-century American businesswomen
21st-century American businesspeople
Businesspeople from Nebraska
Verizon Communications people
Alltel
People from Lancaster County, Nebraska
Year of birth missing (living people)
Living people
21st-century American politicians
Nebraska Republicans
Catholics from Nebraska
University of Minnesota alumni
People from Arizona
20th-century American politicians
First Ladies and Gentlemen of Nebraska